This is a list of fellows of the Royal Society elected in 1778.

Fellows
 John Alstroemer (1742–1786)
 Wade Toby Caulfeild (1732–1800)
 Thomas Cave (1737–1780), naturalist
 Henry Dawkins (c.1728–1814), MP 
 Matthew Dobson (1732–1784)
 John Douglas (1721–1807), Bishop of Salisbury
 Joseph Else (d. 1780), anatomist
 Henry Charles Englefield (1752–1822), antiquary
 Anthony Fothergill (1732–1813), physician
 Archibald Campbell Fraser (1736–1815), consul and MP
 Thomas de Grey, 2nd Baron Walsingham (1748–1818), politician
 Alexander Hay, physician
 Benjamin Heath (d. 1817), Headmaster of Harrow school
 Robert Banks Hodgkinson (c.1721–1822)
 William Augustus Howard (d. 1800)
 Charles Peter Layard (1749–1903), Dean of Bristol
 John Lockman (c.1721–1807), canon
 Joseph Nash (d. 1782)
 Henry Partridge (d. 1803), barrister
 William Preston (1729–1789), Bishop of Leighlin and Ferns
 Lancelot Shadwell (d. 1815)
 Robert Boyle-Walsingham (1736–1780), Naval officer and MP
 James Watson (1748–1796), lawyer
 Richard Worsley (1751–1805), MP
 William Wright (1735–1819), botanist
 John Wyatt (d. 1797), surgeon

References

1778
1778 in science
1778 in England